David Nutt (born 1951) is a British psychiatrist and neuropsychopharmacologist.

David Nutt may also refer to:

David Nutt (publisher) (died 1868), English publisher
David H. Nutt, American lawyer and philanthropist

See also
 Nutt